Noddle may refer to:

Jeff Noddle, the executive chairman of SuperValu 
William Noddle, who settled on Noddle's Island (one of Boston Harbor Islands off East Boston, Massachusetts, USA) in 1629
Noddle (credit report service), a former British credit report service offered by TransUnion

See also
 Noodle (disambiguation)